Mazovia encoding is used under DOS to represent Polish texts. Basically it is code page 437 with some positions filled with Polish letters. An important feature was that the block graphic characters of code page 437 remained unchanged. In contrast, IBM's later official Central European code page 852 did not preserve all block graphics, causing incorrect display in programs such as Norton Commander.

It was designed as part of a project to develop and produce a Polish IBM PC clone codenamed "". The code page was therefore optimized for that computer's typical peripheral devices, a graphics card with dual switchable graphics, a keyboard using US English and Russian layouts and printers with Polish fonts. In 1986, the Polish National Bank (NBP) adopted the Mazovia encoding as a standard, thereby causing its widespread acceptance and distribution in Poland.

Some ambiguity exists in the official code page assignment for the Mazovia encoding:

PTS-DOS and S/DOS support this encoding under code page 667 (CP667). The same encoding was also called code page 991 (CP991) in some Polish software, however, the FreeDOS implementation of code page 991 seems not to be identical to this original encoding.
The DOS code page switching file NECPINW.CPI for NEC Pinwriters supports the Mazovia encoding under both code pages 667 and 991. FreeDOS has meanwhile introduced support for the original Mazovia encoding under code page 790 (CP790) as well. The Fujitsu DL6400 (Pro) / DL6600 (Pro) printers support the Mazovia encoding as well. This encoding is known as code page 3843 in Star printers.

Character set
Each character is shown with its equivalent Unicode code point. Only the second half of the table (128–255) is shown, all of the first half (0–127) being the same as ASCII and code page 437.

Several variants of this encoding exists:

 Mazovia 157 (ś is at 9D instead of 9E)
 Fido Mazovia (ć is at 0x87 instead of 8D and Ć is at 0x80 instead of 0x95)
 FreeDOS Mazovia (złoty sign at 9B). FreeDOS supports this variant under code page 991, although the original definition of code page 991, which pre-dates FreeDOS, appears to have been identical to code page 667 / 790.

These variants are not fully compliant with the definition of code page 667 / 790 and should therefore not be associated with these numbers.

See also

 CWI-2 encoding
 Hardware code page
 Kamenický encoding

Notes

References

DOS code pages